The Leo Petroglyph is a sandstone petroglyph containing 37 images of humans and other animals as well as footprints of each. The petroglyph is located near the small village of Leo, Ohio (in Jackson County, Ohio) and is thought to have been created by the Fort Ancient peoples (possibly AD 1000–1650). A  slab containing the 37 carvings is protected by a wooden shelter, a Works Progress Administration project. The meanings of the drawings are unknown. On November 10, 1970, it was added to the National Register of Historic Places. The site is maintained by the Ohio History Connection.

References

External links

Fort Ancient culture
Petroglyphs in Ohio
Pre-statehood history of Ohio
Archaeological sites on the National Register of Historic Places in Ohio
Protected areas of Jackson County, Ohio
National Register of Historic Places in Jackson County, Ohio
Ohio History Connection
Sandstone in the United States